Portuguese Indonesians are native Indonesians with Portuguese ancestry or have had adopted "Portuguese" customs and some practices such as religion.

The Black Portuguese 
As a political entity in the eastern part of Insular Southeast Asia, they arose with the Portuguese settlement on the small Island of Solor (from the 1560s), using Solor as a stepping-stone to the trade in sandalwood on Timor. When the Dutch East India Company conquered Solor in 1613, the Portuguese community moved to Larantuka on Flores. In spite of continuous hostilities with the Dutch, the Topasses managed to obtain a steady foothold on Timor after 1641, and part of the population of Larantuka moved over to West Timor in the late 1650s, as a response to the establishment of the VOC in Kupang in 1653. They were able to defeat Dutch military expeditions on Timor with the help of Timorese allies, in 1653, 1655, 1656 and 1657.

The peace treaty between Portugal and the Netherlands in 1663 removed the acute threat from the latter. By this time, the Topasses consisted of an ethnic mix of Portuguese, Florenese, Timorese, Indians, Dutch deserters, etc. Through their military skills they were able to dominate large parts of Timor, with their center in Lifau in the present-day Oecussi-Ambeno enclave.

Briefly before 1600, Portuguese traders left Solor and settled in Larantuka. The traders were in conflict with the Dominicans in Solor, because they were more interested in trade than in Christianization. In 1613, the Dutch occupied Solor and the Dominicans moved to Larantuka, too.

In the beginning Larantuka was an interstation for the trade of sandalwood from Timor and became the Portuguese trading center of South East Indonesia. It became even a place of refuge for deserters of the Dutch East India Company (VOC).

Two waves of immigration brought additionally boost. As the Dutch conquered Malacca in 1641, they brought many Portuguese speaking people from Malacca to Batavia including Portuguese descent as slave, in 1661 they were released after given an option to abandon Catholicism for Protestantism, those who accepted were allowed to settle in Kampung Tugu and therefore recognized as Mardijker, while those who refused were banished to Flores. It is presumed that those who were banished would find themselves settling in Larantuka and the population grew healthily. Two villages, Wureh and Konga, also accommodated the new people.

The Portuguese took indigenous wives, but they always wrote down the Portuguese ancestry. This new population group was called Topasses, but they called themselves Larantuqueiros (inhabitants of Larantuka). The Dutch called them also Zwarte Portugeesen ("black Portuguese").

The Larantuqueiros turned out a loose, but mighty power in the region, which influence reached far beyond the settlement. The core cell was the federation of Larantuka, Wureh and Konga. Theoretically they were subordinated to Portugal. But in practice they were free. They had no Portuguese administration and they did not pay taxes. Letters of the Lisbon government were ignored. For long years there was a bloody struggle for power between the families da Costa and de Hornay. At the end they shared the power.

The Larantuqueiros made "alliances" with the indigenous people of Flores and Timor. They followed a certain strategy; the most notable raja was converted to Catholicism by military pressure. He had to take an oath of allegiance to the king of Portugal and thereon the title Dom was granted to him. The raja was allowed to rule his folk autonomous, but in war he had to supply auxiliary forces.

The Larantuqueiros were the rulers and established Portuguese as the official language to distance themselves from the natives. The language of commerce was the Malay, which was understood on the surrounding islands.

Setbacks and heritage 

Portuguese influence was reduced to the areas of Solor, Flores and Timor in East Nusa Tenggara now, following the defeat in 1575 at the hands of residents of Ternate, Dutch conquests in Ambon, North Maluku and Banda, and a general failure to sustain control of trade in this region. Compared with the initial ambition of dominating Asian trade, their influence on the culture of Indonesia is relatively small: keroncong guitar ballads; number of words in the Indonesian language absorbed from the Portuguese who had been a lingua franca in addition to Malay. With the arrival of the Dutch and their conquest of Malacca, the Portuguese had their trading network disrupted. The Dutch also caused much of the conflict in the area which lasted for generations. The Portuguese, however continued the spread of early Christianity in Indonesia. Until now, the Christian population mostly found in eastern Indonesia.

In Kampung Tugu, Koja, North Jakarta, several Mardijker people were settled here. Some of these people are descendants of the Portuguese while some are descendants of slaves who are able to speak "Portuguese", and were brought to Batavia (now Jakarta) as prisoners of war after the Dutch VOC conquered Malacca in 1641 and because of their conversion to Protestantism.

In Lamno, Aceh, a community of people often noted for their blue eyes and fairer skin complexion are purportedly Muslim descendants of Portuguese. According to Indonesian media, they, or at least most of them, were wiped out by the 2004 Indian Ocean earthquake and tsunami.

Notable Portuguese Indonesians

References 

Indonesia
Indonesia